Slade Hooton  is a hamlet in the Metropolitan Borough of Rotherham, in South Yorkshire, England. Historically in the West Riding of Yorkshire, the hamlet was moved into South Yorkshire in April 1974.

History
Slade Hooton is recorded in the Domesday Book as Hotone, and having three carucates of land. The name of the hamlet derives from Slæd and hõh-tũn, which means valley and farmstead on a spur of land. The Slade prefix is thought to be able to distinguish it from other Hooton's such as Hooton Levitt and Hooton Pagnell.

A bus that runs three times a day, and connects Rotherham with Dinnington, stops at the south end of the hamlet.

Governance
Historically, Slade Hooton was in the wapentake of Upper Strafforth, and the shire county of the West Riding of Yorkshire. Since 1974, it has been in the Metropolitan county of South Yorkshire.  It is now also in the Metropolitan Borough of Rotherham. The population of the village is recorded in the 2011 Census under the civil parish of Laughton en le Morthen.

References

External links
Laughton en le Morthen parish

Villages in South Yorkshire
Geography of the Metropolitan Borough of Rotherham